Lie Down in Darkness may refer to:

Lie Down in Darkness (novel), a 1951 novel by William Styron
"Lie Down in Darkness" (A-ha song), 1993
"Lie Down in Darkness" (Moby song), 2011